Handball Australia hosts two separate national club championships. The first is a Beach Handball nationals competition and the second is the Australia Handball Club Championships featuring the state champions for Handball. The winner of the Handball Club Championships qualifies to represent Australia in the Oceania Handball Champions Cup.

The inaugural winner of the Handball 
Club Championships competition was New South Wales based Sydney Uni over Victorian based St Kilda HC. The tournament was held at Sydney Olympic Park and featured teams from New South Wales, Victoria and Queensland.

The inaugural winners of the beach competition for men was won by the East Melbourne Spartans from Victoria. The women's and the mixed event was won by Tang from New South Wales.

Champions

Men's Handball

Women's Handball

Men's Beach Handball

Women's Beach Handball

Mixed Beach

Men's wheelchair

Handball League Australia

See main article - Handball League Australia

See also

Australian Handball Federation
Handball League Australia
Oceania Handball Champions Cup

References

External links
 2014 Indoor report AHF webpage. Retrieved 15 Oct 2014
 2014 Beach results table. Retrieved 17 Oct 2014
 Beach Handball. The Daily Telegraph. 29 May, 2014.
 2016 Beach titles. WHM Magazine pages 64-65.
 2016 Australian Club Championship. AHF webpage.
 2017 Australian Beach titles report. AHF webpage
 2018 Australian Armed Services Handball. Navy Daily. 12 May 2018

Handball competitions in Australia
Beach handball competitions